Carlo Cafiero (September 1, 1846 – July 17, 1892) was an Italian anarchist, champion of Mikhail Bakunin during the second half of the 19th century and one of the main proponents of anarcho-communism and insurrectionary anarchism during the First International.

Selected works 

 Carlo Cafiero. Revolution. Black Cat Press. 
 Il Capitale di Carlo Marx, brevemente compendiato da Carlo Cafiero, Biblioteca Socialista, n. 5, Bignami e c. editori, Milan 1879. Online version (in Italian)
 "Anarchia e Comunismo", Le Révolté, Geneva, 13 and 27 November 1880. An English translation is in Daniel Guérin, No Gods No Masters, Book 1, AK Press 1998.
 Carlo Cafiero, La rivoluzione per la rivoluzione. Raccolta di scritti a cura e con introduzione di Gianni Bosio, Milan 1968 (some texts are in French). This book was republished with all texts in Italian, as Carlo Cafiero, Rivoluzione per la rivoluzione. Raccolta di scritti a cura e con introduzione di Gianni Bosio, Rome 1970.
 Gian Carlo Maffei (ed.), Dossier Cafiero, Bergamo 1974.

References

Further reading

External links 
 About Carlo Cafiero
 Carlo Cafiero, 1846-1892. Biography of the Italian anarchist who developed communist anarchism at Federazione dei Comunisti Anarchici
 Carlo Cafiero Page at Daily Bleed's Anarchist Encyclopedia
 Page at Italy's Who's Who 
 Writings of Carlo Cafiero
 Carlo Cafiero Archive at RevoltLib.com
 Carlo Cafiero Archive at Marxists.org
 Carlo Cafiero Archive at TheAnarchistLibrary.org

1846 births
1892 deaths
Anarcho-communists
Italian anarchists
Italian communists
Italian socialists
Jura Federation
Members of the International Workingmen's Association
People from Barletta
People from Nocera Inferiore